The dodo is an extinct flightless bird that was endemic to the island of Mauritius.

Dodo or Dodos may also refer to:

Publications
 The Dodo (magazine), a satirical humor magazine published by cadets at the United States Air Force Academy
 The Dodo (website), an American online publisher focused on animals and animal rights issues 
 Dodo, an 1893 novel by E. F. Benson
 a secret American government agency in The Rise and Fall of D.O.D.O., a 2017 novel by Neal Stephenson and Nicole Galland

Music

Bands
 The Dodos, an American indie rock band
 Dodo and the Dodos, a Danish pop band

Songs
 "Dodo" (David Bowie song), by David Bowie
 "Dodo", a song by Genesis from the 1981 album Abacab
 "Dodo", a song by Dave Matthews from the 2003 album Some Devil
 "Dodo 1", a song by Stromae from the 2010 album Cheese
 "The Dodo", a song by Bad Religion from the 2002 album Punk Rock Songs

Film and television
 DoDo, The Kid from Outer Space, a 1960s animated series
 Dodo, a 2022 film directed by Panos H. Koutras

People
 Dodoth people, an ethnic group in Uganda also known as Dodos
 Dodo (name), a list of people with the given name or surname
 Dodo (nickname), a list
 Dodo (painter), German painter Dörte Clara Wolff (1907–1998)
 Carol Cheng, Hong Kong actress and host nicknamed "Do Do"

Fictional characters
 Dodo (Alice's Adventures in Wonderland)
 Gogo Dodo, in the animated series Tiny Toon Adventures
 Dodo Chaplet, from the TV series Doctor Who
 Yoyo Dodo, in the 1938 animated short film Porky in Wackyland

Other uses
 Dodo (Biblical name), three individuals mentioned in the Bible
 Dodo, Ohio, a community in the United States
 Mount Dodo, or Mount Dodogamine, Japan
 Dodo Services, an Australian telecommunications, energy and insurance company
 A beer produced by Brasseries de Bourbon on Réunion Island
 Dodo (automobile company), an American manufacturer of the DODO cyclecar in 1912
 Fried plantain, called "dodo" in Nigeria

See also
 Dodo Club, children's wing of the Durrell Wildlife Conservation Trust
 Do-Do ChestEze, an over-the-counter pharmaceutical
Fais do-do, a Cajun dance party
Widodo